In Chinese, Tibetan and Japanese Buddhism, Hayagrīva ("having the neck of a horse") is an important deity who originated as a yaksha attendant of Avalokiteśvara or Guanyin Bodhisattva in India. Appearing in the Vedas as two separate deities, he was assimilated into the ritual worship of early Buddhism and eventually was identified as a Wisdom King in Vajrayana Buddhism.

In Tibet 
In Tibet, Hayagriva was promoted especially by Buddhist teacher Atiśa and appeared as a worldly dharmapala. His special ability is to cure diseases, especially skin diseases even as serious as leprosy, which is said to be caused by nāgas.

According to the myth, Hayagriva is the wrathful form of Vajrasattva, who assumes the form Avalokiteshvara and turns into Hayagriva in order to defeat the powerful demon Rudra, who has submitted the gods. He is accompanied by Vajrapani, who assumes the power of Tara and then becomes the wrathful Vajravārāhī. The two are cosmically related to Rudra, as in their previous lives, Vajrasattva was Rudra's master, while Vajrapani was his fellow disciple, who unlike Rudra understood and respected dharma. Hayagriva and Vajravarahi challenge Rudra through nine mighty dances and battle with him, and at the end, Hayagriva turns diminutive and enters Rudra's anus, after which he turns into a giant and destroys him from inside out. Vanquished, Rudra promises to become a protector of dharma, and his demonic body is worn as a garb by Hayagriva, who emerges with his horse head from the skull.

In another version, Vajrasattva impersonates Rudra and seduces the latter's wife, the rakshasha queen Krodhisvari. Hayagriva is reborn as the resultant child, Vajrarakshasha, who takes over Rudra's realm, submits him and destroys him by plunging a three-pointed khaṭvāṅga into his chest. He then devours Rudra, purifies him in his stomach and excretes him turned into a servant of dharma, who hands his army of demons to him as attendants.

In Japan 

In Japanese Mahayana Buddhism, Hayagriva is considered a form of Avalokiteśvara with wrathful form (Batō Kannon 馬頭觀音, lit. Hayagrīva-Avalokiteśvara/ Horse Head Avalokiteśvara), one of the six Avalokiteśvaras intended to save the sentient beings of the six realms: deities (deva), demigods (asura), human beings, animals, hungry ghosts, beings of hell. Hayagriva's sphere is realm of animals (or beings whose state of mind are animal-like). In Folk religion in Japan, Hayagriva was also worshipped as the guardian deity for horses because of its name Horse-head (Batō). The horse was symbolized as a vehicle, not as one of Hayagriva's heads.

In China 
In Chinese Buddhism, Hayagriva is known as Mǎtóu Guānyīn 馬頭觀音 (lit. Hayagrīva-Avalokiteśvara/ Horse Head Avalokiteśvara). He is venerated as a guardian protector of travel and transportation, especially for cars, and is sometimes placed at the entrance and exits of temples to bless visitors. In some temples, visitors are allowed to have their license plates enshrined in front of an image of this deity to invoke his protection over their vehicle. He is also counted as one of the 500 Arhats, where he is known as Mǎtóu Zūnzhě 馬頭尊者 (lit. The Venerable Horse Head). Similar to Japan, he is also considered to be one of the six Avalokiteśvaras intended to save the sentient beings of the six realms of Saṃsāra, with his sphere being the realm of animals (or beings whose state of mind are animal-like). He is commonly conflated with another form of Avalokiteśvara that also performs this same function in the Tiantai tradition: Amoti Avalokiteśvara (Āmótí Guānyīn 阿摩提觀音) or Lion Fearless Guanyin (Shīzǐ Wúwèi Guānyīn 獅子無畏觀音), which is considered to be one of thirty-three main incarnations of Avalokiteśvara and is often portrayed in iconography as riding on a white lion as a mount. 
In Taoism, Hayagriva was syncretized and incorporated within the Taoist pantheon as the god Mǎ Wáng 馬王 (lit. Horse King), who is associated with fire. In this form, he is usually portrayed with 6 arms and a third eye on the forehead.

In Chinese folk tradition, Hayagriva was sometimes assimilated into Horse-Face, one of two theriomorphic guardians of Diyu, the underworld. Some Chinese horse owners also worship Hayagriva in a non underworld form to protect their horses.

Buddhist iconography
In his simplest form Hayagriva is depicted with one face, two arms and two legs, and a horse head above his head. Everything about him is wrathful - a scowling face with three glaring eyes, a roaring mouth with protruding fangs, a pose of warrior’s aggressiveness, a broad belly bulging with inner energy, a sword raised threateningly in his right hand (poised to cut through delusion), his left hand raised in a threatening gesture and snake ornaments. This terrifying aspect expresses compassion’s fierce determination to help us overcome inner egotism and outer obstructions.

In other representations, Hayagriva has six hands, four or eight legs and three large eyes. in these versions, on the top of Hayagriva’s head are three small green horse heads. The legs stand on two corpses, symbolizing the mundane attachments that should be destroyed.

Gallery

See also
Hayagriva in Hinduism

References

Works cited

External links

Dharmapalas
Pastoral gods
Avalokiteśvara
Wisdom Kings
Vajrayana
Herukas
Wrathful deities